Bowsman is an unincorporated urban community in the Municipality of Minitonas – Bowsman, Manitoba, Canada.

The community is 16 kilometres north of the Town of Swan River. Bowsman was originally incorporated as a village in 1949, but lost that status upon its amalgamation with the Rural Municipality of Minitonas on 1 January 2015.

The economy is supported by agriculture and logging. Currently the community offers a hotel with restaurant, lounge, and bar, K–8 school, hockey arena, curling rink, 3 baseball diamonds, library, post office.

History 

Bowsman was originally incorporated as a village in 1949. J.B. Tyrell, a surveyor, came up with the name "Bowsman" after the first man out of the bow of the boat who touched the land. Originally known as "Bowsman River" because of the river, the name was shortened to Bowsman in 1952.

From 1948-1953 Bowsman had a semi-pro baseball team. From 1952 to 1955 they competed in the Manitoba-Saskatchewan League. This team was inducted into the Manitoba Baseball Hall of Fame in 2001.

On 1 January 2015, Bowsman lost its status as a village upon its amalgamation with the Rural Municipality of Minitonas.

Biffy Burning 
Bowsman completed their first municipal sewer lines and sewage treatment plant in October 1966. The project connected the majority of homes in town to the town sewer lines. For many people, this was the day that their outdoor pit toilet or "biffy" was replaced by an indoor flush toilet. Trucks hauled the discarded wooden biffies to make a large pile near the new sewage plant.

On New Year's Eve, 31 December 1966, residents gathered to celebrate the beginning of Canada's Centennial year and the arrival of community sewer service by burning the pile of their old outhouses.

A monument to commemorate the day of the "Biffy Burning" was dedicated on Canada Day, 1970. In 1971, postal codes in Manitoba were introduced; Bowsman's postal code was changed to R0L 0H0 which is said to stand for "Roll Our Loyal Out Houses Over" in honour of this event.

Demographics 

References

Designated places in Manitoba
Unincorporated communities in Parkland Region, Manitoba
Unincorporated urban communities in Manitoba
1949 establishments in Manitoba
Former villages in Manitoba
Populated places disestablished in 2015

9. “Bowsman Marroons 1948–1953 • Manitoba Baseball Hall of Fame.” Manitoba Baseball Hall of Fame, https://mbhof.ca/groups/bowsman-marroons-1948-1953/.